Antoine Duléry (born 14 November 1959 in Paris) is a French actor.

Filmography

References

External links

1959 births
Living people
Male actors from Paris
French male film actors
French male television actors
French male stage actors
20th-century French male actors
21st-century French male actors
Chevaliers of the Ordre des Arts et des Lettres